Time in Ukraine is defined as UTC+02:00 and in summer as UTC+03:00. Part of Eastern European Time, it is locally referred to as Kyiv Time. The change for the summer time takes place in the last Sunday of March at 03:00 when the time is changed by an hour ahead, and the last Sunday of October at 04:00, when the time changes an hour back. In this way, the clocks in Ukraine are always one hour ahead of those in central Europe.

Geographical description
The territory of Ukraine in Europe stretches 17°57' along a longitude or about 1.2 hours. Almost 95% of its territory is located in the Eastern European Time Zone with exceptions of its western and eastern extremities. Small portion of Zakarpattia Oblast is located in the Central European Time Zone, while Luhansk Oblast, most of Donetsk Oblast, and part of Kharkiv Oblast are geographically located in the Further-eastern European Time Zone. However, the whole country officially observes Eastern European Time.
 Eastern extremity: village of Chervona Zirka (Velykotsk council), Milove Raion, Luhansk Oblast - 40°11′53″ (eastern longitude)
 Western extremity: village of Solomonovo, Uzhhorod Raion, Zakarpattia Oblast - 22°09′50″ (eastern longitude)
 Vernadsky Research Base in Antarctic is located in the Atlantic Time Zone (UTC-04:00).

History
Daylight saving time in Ukraine was introduced in the early 1980s. On 20 September 2011, the Verkhovna Rada (Ukrainian parliament) canceled the return from Eastern European Summer Time to Eastern European Time. On 18 October 2011, the Parliament abolished these plans. On 29 March 2014, after annexation by Russia, Crimea switched from Eastern European Time (UTC+02:00) to Moscow Time (UTC+04:00 then, subsequently changed to UTC+03:00). On 26 October 2014, the self-proclaimed proto-states of Donetsk People's Republic and Luhansk People's Republic also switched to Moscow Time.

IANA time zone database
The IANA time zone database contains four zones for Ukraine in the file zone.tab:

 Europe/Kyiv – most locations
 Europe/Uzhgorod – Ruthenia (because it used Central European Time in 1990/1991)
 Europe/Zaporozhye – Zaporizhzhia, Luhansk Oblast
 Europe/Simferopol – central Crimea

See also
Date and time notation in Ukraine

References

External links
 Ukraine Time and DST
 Current time in Ukraine
 Declaration of Cabinet of Ministers of Ukraine about the order of calculating time on the territory of Ukraine. Official document #509/96. May 13, 1996